John Condict Carpenter (December 7, 1884 – June 4, 1933) was an American sprinter. He competed at the 1908 Summer Olympics in London, contributing to one of the many sporting controversies of the 1908 Games.

Early life
John Carpenter was born in Washington, DC in 1884, the oldest child of noted travel writer Frank G. Carpenter and Joanna Carpenter (née Condict), and the brother of future author and folklorist Frances Carpenter. Carpenter traveled widely in the company of his family throughout his childhood, before matriculating at Cornell University, from which he graduated in 1907.  Carpenter placed third in the 1908 collegiate national track and field championship 440 yard, while running for Cornell.

Participation in the 1908 London Olympics

He advanced to the finals in the men's 400 meters race at the 1908 Summer Olympics after winning his preliminary heat with a time of 49.8 seconds and his semifinal in 49.4 seconds. In the first running of the final race, Carpenter came in first out of the four runners, clocking 47.8 seconds. However, umpire Roscoe Badger determined that Carpenter had willfully interfered with British runner Wyndham Halswelle. Though the obstructing maneuver was then legal under American rules, the Olympic contests were held under British rules, which did not allow it. Carpenter was disqualified and the race was ordered to be repeated without him. His countrymen, John Taylor and William Robbins, protested the ruling by boycotting the second final, leaving Halswelle to take the gold medal uncontested in the only walkover in the modern Olympic history.

Legacy and death
The disputed race was instrumental in the formation of the International Amateur Athletic Federation before the next Olympics, which sought to standardize the rules by which various sports played around the world. Additionally, judges were no longer provided by the host country but rather allocated from an international pool. As for the 400 meter sprint, following 1908, lanes were introduced to reduce incidents of runner-interference.

Carpenter dropped racing after 1908 and went on to become a patent attorney and investment broker in Chicago. He married Laura Helen Elliott, and had three children, Frank George Carpenter, Marion Frances Carpenter, John Elliot Carpenter. He was hit and killed by a train in 1933.

References

Sources

External links 
 Profile at Sports-Reference.com

1884 births
1933 deaths
Cornell University alumni
Athletes (track and field) at the 1908 Summer Olympics
Olympic track and field athletes of the United States
American male sprinters